was a senior member of Aum Shinrikyo, responsible for the deaths of a combined 19 people and for the production of sarin, VX nerve agent, PCP and LSD. He is also notable for not showing remorse at the trials and remaining loyal to cult leader Shoko Asahara. He was member of the Ministry of Health of the cult, with prosecutors calling him "the second most important figure involved in the gas attacks by the Aum Shinrikyo cult, after cult leader Shoko Asahara himself."

Biography
A native of Chiyoda, Tokyo, he joined Aum at the age of 26 in 1991 after a yoga class he took as treatment for whiplash he suffered in a car accident. Tsuchiya earned his master’s degree in physical and organic chemistry from University of Tsukuba before fully committing to Aum Shinrikyo.

Tsuchiya was charged with seven counts: the 1995 Tokyo subway sarin attack that killed 12 people; the June 1994 sarin attack in Matsumoto, Nagano Prefecture, that killed seven; the three VX gas attacks, in 1994 and 1995, that killed one; production of PCP; and harboring Aum fugitives. During the trials, he was notably defiant and insulted the prosecution and families of the victims and showed loyalty to Asahara. He was found guilty of all counts in January 2004 and sentenced to death. The judge who delivered the sentence said that though not directly involved in the attacks, he deserved to die for his "sheer evil".

Tsuchiya was notably loyal to Asahara, describing himself a "direct disciple of the guru", and calling Asahara sonshi (honorable master).

After his death sentence was handed by the Tokyo District Court, he repeatedly asked for a commutation of sentence from death to life imprisonment, but his request was turned down first by the Tokyo High Court in August 2006 and later by the Supreme Court, which rejected his appeal with the argument that he played a decisive role in the 1995 attack against the subway. Tsuchiya reacted saying "Natural result. I wanted to think about what I could do with a life-long apology." His death sentence was finalized in 2011 and he was executed along with Asahara and five other cultists on July 6, 2018.

See also
 Capital punishment in Japan
 List of executions in Japan

References

1965 births
2018 deaths
People executed by Japan by hanging
Aum Shinrikyo
Terrorism in Japan
Japanese people convicted of murder
21st-century executions by Japan
Japanese chemists
Executed Japanese people
People from Chiyoda, Tokyo
Japanese mass murderers
Executed mass murderers